Thonburi railway station may refer to these stations in Thailand:
 Thon Buri railway station, the current terminus of the Southern Line, opened 1999
 Bangkok Noi railway station, the old Thonburi railway station, in service from 1903 to 2003
 Krung Thonburi BTS station, on the Silom Line of the BTS Skytrain